Radhika Vemula is an Indian activist for Dalit rights and against caste based discrimination.

She continues the work started by her son, Rohith Vemula (leader of Ambedkar Students' Association), who committed suicide in the University of Hyderabad in 2016 - an incident which sparked outrage across India and gained widespread media attention as a case of Dalit discrimination in Indian universities. During the protest at the University of Hyderabad, police had arrested Radhika Vemula and other students on the first death anniversary of her son. She is seeking to end caste discrimination in universities and other higher education institutions.

Family 
Radhika Vemula mothered three children, her older son Rohith(30/01/1989 to 17/01/2016),a younger son Raja, and her daughter Nileema.

Conversion to Buddhism 
On 14 April 2016, on the 125th Ambedkar Jayanti, Radhika Vemula, and her son Raja converted to Buddhism in Mumbai, Maharashtra. Prakash Ambedkar, grandson of Babasaheb Ambedkar, initiated the family of Rohit to Buddhism at Dr. Babasaheb Ambedkar Bhavan in Dadar, Mumbai.

References 

Living people
Indian women's rights activists
Indian Buddhists
21st-century Buddhists
Converts to Buddhism from Hinduism
Year of birth missing (living people)
Dalit women
Dalit rights activists

Activists from Andhra Pradesh